Amulaya Pandrekar (born 31 March 1996) is an Indian cricketer. He made his first-class debut for Goa in the 2014–15 Ranji Trophy on 21 January 2015. He made his Twenty20 debut for Goa in the 2016–17 Inter State Twenty-20 Tournament on 3 February 2017. He made his List A debut for Goa in the 2016–17 Vijay Hazare Trophy on 28 February 2017.

References

External links
 

1996 births
Living people
Indian cricketers
Goa cricketers
Place of birth missing (living people)